The 2018 MIB Nordic Gorzów FIM Speedway Grand Prix of Poland was the seventh race of the 2018 Speedway Grand Prix season. It took place on August 25 at the Edward Jancarz Stadium in Gorzów, Poland.

Riders 
The Speedway Grand Prix Commission nominated Szymon Woźniak as the wild card, and Wiktor Lampart and Rafał Karczmarz both as Track Reserves.

Results 
The Grand Prix was won by Martin Vaculík, who beat Bartosz Zmarzlik, Tai Woffinden and Patryk Dudek in the final. Overall Zmarzlik moved into second place in the standings, cutting Woffinden's world championship lead to 16 points. Fredrik Lindgren dropped to fourth overall, below Janowski in third, after picking up just two points.

Heat details

Intermediate classification

References 

Poland
Sports competitions in Poland
Grand